Ian Stephenson (born 1 December 1955) is an Australian curator who since 2021 has been President of The Glebe Society in Sydney, New South Wales. He has been on the board of the National Trust of Australia (NSW) since 2010 and has been chair of the properties committee since 2014. Stephenson is a trustee of the Copland Foundation and an area of special interest and knowledge is Anglo Indian architecture.

Early life
Stephenson was born in Sydney and attended Newington College (1965–1972) as a day student commencing in Wyvern House. In 1973 he became a boarding student at Scots Bathurst completing his HSC in 1974. He then studied at the University of Tasmania and the University of Sydney.

Curatorial career
In 1988 Stephenson became the inaugural curator of the Bicentennial Museum at Liverpool. From 1990 he worked at the National Trust of Australia (NSW) and spent seven years as the Senior Curator. In 2001 he was appointed the Director of Historic Places, ACT, in Canberra and from 2006 was the CEO of the National Trust in South Australia. From 2009 until 2020 he was the curator of collections at the University of New England. In 2018 Stephenson curated a major exhibition at Old Government House, Parramatta, entitled “From Bombay to Parramatta, discover the rich history between India and NSW, from the time of Governor Macquarie to today’s vibrant cultural life of Western Sydney and beyond”.

References

Australian historians
Australian curators
People educated at Newington College
University of Sydney alumni
University of Tasmania alumni
1955 births
Living people